Cronaca nera (Italian for Black news) is a 1947 Italian crime film directed by Giorgio Bianchi and starring María Denis, Gino Cervi and Andrea Checchi. The title refers to the section given over to crime stories in Italian newspapers.

Plot synopsis
A mob boss (Gino Cervi) wanted by the police takes refuge at the home of his unsuspecting associate's (Andrea Checchi) honest family, aiming to regroup his gang again when the time is right. In the process, he falls in love with his associate’s sister (María Denis) and decides to go straight.

Critical reception
On the occasion of Cronaca nera'''s 2015 showing on Harvard's film program, the film was described as "neorealist cinema itself" and as "exemplifying the fatalism associated with noir" in "films such as Ossessione'' (1943)." The program also noted that "among the film’s screenwriters are Sergio Amidei and Cesare Zavattini, who between them worked on most of the postwar masterpieces by Rossellini and de Sica."

Cast
 María Denis 
 Gino Cervi 
 Andrea Checchi 
 Giuseppe Porelli 
 Luigi Almirante 
 Manoel Roero 
 Renato Chiantoni 
 Marisa Vernati 
 Giannina Chiantoni 
 Jucci Kellerman 
 Luigi Pavese 
 Armando Guarnieri

References

Bibliography

External links 
 

1947 crime films
Italian crime films
1947 films
1940s Italian-language films
Films directed by Giorgio Bianchi
Italian black-and-white films
Films scored by Alessandro Cicognini
1940s Italian films